Mausoleum of Kamal-ol-molk is the mausoleum of Kamal-ol-Molk, a famous Persian painter, in the south-east of the city of Nishapur. This building is located near the Tomb of Attar of Nishapur. This tomb was designed by the famous Iranian architect of the time, Hooshang Seyhoun. This memorial was opened in April 1,1963 with the presence of Farah Pahlavi the Shahbanu of the Imperial State of Iran.

Gallery

Sources 

Buildings and structures in Nishapur
Buildings and structures in Razavi Khorasan Province
Tourist attractions in Razavi Khorasan Province
Mausoleums in Iran
Hooshang Seyhoun buildings